This is a list of museums in Spain. According to the Ministry of Culture, there are about 1,500 museums in Spain.

Andalusia

Province of Almería

Province of Cádiz 
 Casa Pinillos
 Casa de la Contaduría 
 Casa del Terror y lo Fantástico Cádiz Oculto
 Museum of Cadiz
 Museo Arqueológico Municipal de Jerez de la Frontera
 Museo Arqueológico Municipal de El Puerto de Santa María
 Museo Fundación Rafael Alberti
 Museo Histórico Municipal de San Fernando
 Museo de Las Cortes de Cadiz
 Museo Naval de San Fernando
 Museo del Titere 
 Museo Taller Litográfico
 Fundación NMAC-Montenmedio Arte Contemporáneo de Vejer de la Frontera
 Yacimiento Arqueológico Gadir

Province of Córdoba 
 Al Iksir - Museo de la Alquimia
 Archaeological Museum of Córdoba
 Bullfighting Museum of Cordoba
 Casa del Agua
 Casa de Sefarad
 Casa-Museo del Guadamecí Omeya
 Centro de Flamenco Fosforito
 Centro de Creación Contemporánea
 Centro De Arte Contemporaneo Rafael Boti
 La Casa Andalusí
 Museum of Fine Arts of Córdoba
 Museo Julio Romero de Torres de Córdoba
 Museo Torre de la Calahorra de Córdoba
 Palacio de los Paez de Castillejos

Province of Granada 
 Archaeological Museum of Granada
 Museo de Bellas Artes de Granada
 Museo Cuevas del Sacromonte
 Carmen de los Geranios - Casa Museo De Max Moreau
 Casa Museo Federico García Lorca de Granada
 Casa Museo de Manuel de Falla de Granada
 Casa de Zafra
 Centro Cultural Gran Capitan
 Centro José Guerrero
 Judería de Granada
 Museo Parque de las Ciencias de Granada
 Museo de la Alhambra
 Museo de Casa de los Tiros
 Museo Etnológico de la Mujer Gitana
 Museo San Juan de Dios
 Museo Sefardí
 Museo de La Zambra - Cueva de Curro
 Palacio de los Olvidados

Province of Huelva 
 Martin Alonso Pinzon House Museum
 Museo de Huelva
 Centro de Arte Moderno y Contemporáneo Daniel Vázquez Díaz de Nerva
 Centro de la Comunicación Jesús Hermida

Province of Jaén 
 Museo de Jaén
 Museo de Artes y Costumbres del alto Guadalquivir
 Archaeological Museum of Úbeda
 Archaeological Museum of Linares

Province of Málaga 

 Classroom of the Sea Museum Alborania (Aula del Mar.)
 Colección del Museo Ruso
 Flamenco Museum / Peña Juan Breva
 Museo Automovilístico de Málaga 
 Museo de la imaginación
 Museo de Málaga
 Museo Picasso Málaga
 Museo Revello de Toro
 Museo del Vidrio y Cristal de Málaga
 Museo del Vino-Málaga
 Carmen Thyssen Museum
 CAC Málaga
 Museum Jorge Rando
 Centre Georges Pompidou Málaga
 Museo del Grabado Español Contemporáneo de Marbella
 Fundación Picasso
 Principia Science Center
 Interactive Music Museum
 Museo del Patrimonio Municipal

Province of Seville 
 Antiquarium
 Casa de la Ciencia
 Casa de Murillo
 Centro Andaluz de Arte Contemporáneo
 Centro Andaluz de Arte Contemporáneo
 Centro Cerámica Triana
 House Fabiola-Mariano Bellver Donation
 Military Historical Museum of Seville
 Monastery of Santa Maria de las Cuevas
 Museum of Fine Arts of Seville (Museo Bellas Artes de Sevilla)
 Museo de Artes y Costumbres Populares de Sevilla
 Museo del Baile Flamenco
 Archeological Museum of Seville
 Municipal History Museum of Écija (Museo Histórico Municipal de Écija)
 Museum of Popular Arts and Traditions
 Naval Museum Torre Del Oro
 Palacio de la Condesa de Lebrija
 Palacio de las Dueñas
 Palacio Marqueses de la Algaba
 Real Academia de Bellas Artes de Santa Isabel de Hungría
Fundación FOCUS y Centro Velázquez. Seville.

Aragon 
Aljafería (Zaragoza)
Alma Mater Museum
Casa Palacio de los Condes de Bureta
Centro de Historias
Charterhouse of Aula Dei (Zaragoza)
Drawing Museum Castle Larrés July Gavín
 Dinopolis
 Escuela Museo de Origami Zaragoza
 Huesca Museum
 IAACC Pablo Serrano
 La Seo de Zaragoza
 La Era De Vicen
 Mausoleum of the Amantes
 Museo Aquagraria
 Museo Angel Oresanz y Artes de Serrablo
 Museo de Calatayud
 Museo Diocesano de Jaca
 Museo de los Faroles y Rosario de Cristal
 Museo del Foro de Caesaraugusta
 Museo del Fuego y de los Bomberos
 Museo Gonzalvo
Museo Goya - Colección Ibercaja - Museo Camón Aznar (Zaragoza)
Museo del Grabado de Goya
Museo De Juegos Tradicionales
Museo Juan Cabré
Museo de Historia y Tradición de Graus
Museum of Military Miniatures
Museo de las Momias de Quinto
Museo Diocesano Barbastro-Monzón
Museo de la Mina de Mequinenza
Museo Minero Andorra "MWINAS"
Museo Minero de Escucha
Museo naturalista 'La Casa de los Buitres'
Museo Pablo Gargallo
Museo Pedagógico de Aragón
Museo del Puerto Fluvial de Caesaraugusta
El Museo Salvador Victoria
Museo Paleontológico de Galve
Museo de las Termas Públicas de Caesaraugusta
Museo del Teatro de Caesaraugusta
Provincial Museum of Teruel
 San Pablo (Zaragoza)
 Tapestry Museum
Híjar Synagogue
Zaragoza Museum

Principality of Asturias 
 Alfercam Museum
 Archaeological Museum of Asturias
 Asturias Gold Museum
 Black Pottery Museum
 Bowling Museum of Asturias
 Casa de la Apicultura
 Castillo de Salas (castle)
 Centro Niemeyer
 Cider Museum
 Ethnographic Museum of Dairy
 Ethnographic Museum of Grandas de Salime
 Ethnographic Museums Network of Asturias
 Museum of Fine Arts of Asturias
 Gijón Railway Museum
 International Bagpipe Museum
 Juan Barjola Museum of Painting
 Jurassic Museum of Asturias
 LABoral Centro de Arte y Creación Industrial
 Mazonovo
 Mining Museum of Asturias
 Museo Arqueológico de Asturias
 Museum of Avilés Urban History
 Museum of the Asturian People
 Philippe Cousteau Anchor Museum
 Pinacoteca Eduardo Úrculo
 Sacred Art Museum of Tineo
 Museum of the Siderurgy
 Universidad Laboral de Gijón

Balearic Islands 
Casa Museu Dionís Bennàssar
Casa Museo Els Calderers
Es Baluard
Gran Hotel (Palma)
Frédéric Chopin and George Sand Museum
Fundació Pilar i Joan Miró in Mallorca
Museu Arqueològic de Son Fornés
Museu Balear de Ciències Naturals
Museu d’Història de Manacor
Museo Histórico Militar de San Carlos
Museu La Granja d'Esporles
Museum of Mallorca
Museo de Menorca
Puig des Molins
Royal Palace of La Almudaina

Basque Country 
Arkeologi Museoa Bilbao
Arms Industry Museum of Eibar
Arrantzaleen Museoa
Artziniega’s Ethnographic Museum
Artium Museum
Ataria
Basque Railway Museum
Basque Museum of the History of Medicine and Science
Bilbao Fine Arts Museum
Centro de Interpretación Santurtzi Itsasoa
Chillida-Leku
La Encartada Fabrika-Museoa
Eureka! Zientzia Museoa
Euskal Herria Museoa
Euskal Itsas Museoa - Museo Marítimo Vasco
Guggenheim Museum Bilbao
Itsasmuseum Bilbao
Kurutzesantu Museum
Maritime Museum Ria de Bilbao
Museo de Bellas Artes de Álava
Museum Cemento Rezola
Museo de Ciencias Naturales de Álava
Museo Cristóbal Balenciaga
Museo Diocesano de Arte Sacro de Álava
Museo Ferrería El Pobal
Museum of Fournier de Naipes
Museo de la Paz de Guernica
Museo de Los Faroles
Museo de la Minería del País Vasco
Museo de Fotografía y Cine
Museo Pasos de Semana Santa
Musée Basque
Museo Zumalakarregi
Reproductions Museum Bilbao
Rialia Museum
San Telmo Museum
Sagardoetxea - Museo de la Sidra Vasca
TOPIC - Museo y Centro Internacional de la Marioneta de Tolosa
Torre Loizaga

Canary Islands

Lanzarote
Casa Museo del Timple
Casa Museo Palacio Spínola
Castillo de San Gabriel: Museo de Historia de Arrecife
Castillo de San José: International Museum of Art
Museo de Aloe de Lanzarote
Museo Arqueológico de Lanzarote
Museo Atlántico Lanzarote
Museo Aeronáutico del Aeropuerto de Lanzarote
Museo Etnografico Tanit
Museo el Grifo
Museo Internacional de Arte Contemporáneo, MIAC
Museo Lagomar

Tenerife
Archaeological Museum of Puerto de la Cruz
ARTlandya - la Finca, el Mundo Muñecas
Casa de los Balcones
Casa del Carnaval
Casa del Vino
Castle of San Cristóbal (Santa Cruz de Tenerife)
Centro Alfarero y Museo Etnográfico Cha Domitila
Centro de Fotografía Isla de Tenerife
Fundación Cristino de Vera-Espacio Cultural CajaCanarias
Historical Military Museum of the Canary Islands
Latin American Craft Museum of Tenerife
Museo de Antropología de Tenerife
Museo de Arte Sacro El Tesoro De La Concepción
Museo Casa de El Capitán
Museum of Contemporary Art Eduardo Westerdahl (Macew)
Museo de la Naturaleza y Arqueología
Museo Municipal de Bellas Artes de Santa Cruz de Tenerife
Museo del Pescador
Museum of Science and the Cosmos
Museum of the History of Tenerife
Sede Casa de Carta
Tenerife Espacio de las Artes

Gran Canaria
Arucas Municipal Museum
Atlantic Center of Modern Art
Casa de Colón
Casa-Museo Antonio Padrón
Casa-Museo León y Castillo
Casa-Museo Pérez Galdós
Casa-Museo Tomás Morales
Centro de Arte La Regenta
Cueva Pintada Museum and Archaeological Park
Elder Museum of Science and Technology
Museo Canario
Museo Castillo de Mata
Museo Diocesano de Arte Sacro de Las Palmas de Gran Canaria
Museo Etnográfico Casas Cuevas de Artenara
Museo Naval
Museo Néstor
Museo La Zafra
Painted Cave, Galdar
Perez Galdos House Museum

La Palma
Archaeological Museum Benahoarita
Casa de La Cultura de Santo Domingo
Museo Arqueológico Benahoarita
Museo la Casa Roja
Museo de Interpretación del Gofio
Museo Naval - Barco de la Virgen
Museo del Puro Palmero
Museo de la Seda Las Hilanderas
Naval Museum

La Gomera
Casa Bencomo Biblioteca Insular
Casa de Colón
Centro de Interpretación - Las Loceras
Casa de la Miel de Palma
Museo La Alameda
Museo Arqueológico de La Gomera
Museo Etnográfico de La Gomera

Cantabria 
Cades Ferreria
Casa de las Doñas
Centro Botín
Centro de Interpretación de la ciudad de Santander
Centro de Interpretación del Hombre Pez
Ecomuseum Fluviarium of Liérganes
El Capricho
Finca del Marques de Valdecilla
Monastery of Santo Toribio de Liébana
Muralla de Santander
Museum of Prehistory and Archaeology of Cantabria
Museum of the Royal Artillery Factory
Museum of Torture - Inquisicion
Museo de Las Amas de Cría Pasiegas
Museo del Barquillero
Museo de la Campana
Museo de la Cantería "Rodrigo Gil de Hontañón"
Muelle de las Carabelas
Museo Etnográfico de Cantabria 
Museo Etnográfico de Joaquín Sáinz de Rozas
Museo De Las Tres Villas Pasiegas
Museo Marítimo del Cantábrico
Museo De La Naturaleza De Cantabria
Museo De La Vijanera
National Museum and Research Center of Altamira
Observatorio del Arte
Regina Coeli Diocesan Museum
Santa Olaja mill

Castile-La Mancha 
 Albacete Provincial Museum
 Antonio Pérez Foundation Museum
 Army Museum
 Artesanía Burgueño
 Archivo-Museo Sánchez Mejías
 Casa Bellomonte
 Ceramics Museum Ruiz de Luna
 Cueva de Medrano
 El Greco Museum, Toledo
 El Pozo los Lagartos
 Espacio Torner
 Museo de la Acuarela Rafael Requena
 Museo Antonio López
 Museo de Arte Abstracto Español
 Museo de Arte Contemporáneo Infanta Elena
 Museo-Casa de Dulcinea del Toboso
 Museo del Carro y Aperos de Labranza
 Museo Cervantino
 Museo de Ciudad Real
 Museo Comarcal de Daimiel
 Museo del Ejército
 Museo Elisa Cendrero
 Museo de Guadalajara
 Museo del Hidalgo
 Museo de Humor Grafico de Dulcinea
 Museo de los Concilios y la Cultura Visigoda
 Museo Manuel Piña
 Museo de Miniaturas Profesor Max
 Museo Municipal de la Cuchillería de Albacete
 Museo de la Música Pintada - CROMATICA
 Museo Paleontológico de Cuenca 
 Museo Palmero
 Museo Parroquial de Tapices de Pastrana
 Museo del Queso Manchego Toledo
 Museo Santísima Trinidad
 Museo de la Semana Santa de Cuenca
 Museum of Words
 Museum of Santa Cruz
 National Theater Museum
 Palace of the Infantado
 Pintura Mural de Alarcón
 Santa María la Blanca
 Science Museum of Castilla La Mancha
 Sephardic Museum
 Spanish Abstract Art Museum
 Synagogue of El Transito
 Treasure Museum Guarrazar - Guadamur
 Provincial Museum of Ciudad Real
 Museum of Guadalajara

Castile and León 
 CARMUS - Museo Carmelitano Teresa de Jesús
 Casa de Cervantes
 Casa Lis
 Casa Museo de la Ribera
 Casa-Museo Satur Juanela
 Casa de Cervantes
 Casa de las Flores Museo del Juguete de Hojalata
 Castle of Burgos
 Centro de Interpretación del León Romano
 Centro Leonés de Arte
 Christopher Columbus Museum
 Convento de San José (Ávila)
 Episcopal Palace, Astorga
 Fundación Vela Zanetti
 Museum of African Art Arellano Alonso
 Museum of Automotive History
 Museo de Arte Contemporáneo de Castilla y León (León)
 Museo de Ávila
 Museum of Contemporary Spanish Art - Patio Herreriano (Valladolid)
 Museo de la Emigración Leonesa
 Museo Etnográfico de Castilla y León
 Museo del Ferrocarril
 Museo Grand Central
 Museo Herminio Revilla
 Museum of Human Evolution
 Museo de Historia de Arévalo
 Museo de la Industria Harinera de Castilla y León
 Museo de la Industria Chacinera
 Museo Industrial Textil de Béjar
 Museum of Jewellery in the Silver Way, in La Bañeza, León
 Museo de León
 Museo Liceo Egipcio
 Museo Nacional de Escultura
 Museo Numantino
 Museo Patio Herreriano
 Museo de la Radio
 Museo Real Casa de Moneda de Segovia
 Museo Sierra Pambley
 National Sculpture Museum (Valladolid)
 Numantine Museum of Soria
 Oriental Museum (Valladolid)
 Roman Vila de Almenara
 Royal Glass Factory of La Granja
 Royal Palace of La Granja de San Ildefonso, in La Granja de San Ildefonso, province of Segovia
 Royal Palace of Riofrío, in Riofrío, province of Segovia
 San Pedro Cultural Becerril de Campos
 Territorio Artlanza
 Valladolid Science Museum
 VRO La Olmeda
 Valladolid Museum
 Zamora Museum

Catalonia

Extremadura 
 Archaeological Museum of Badajoz
 Baluarte de San Pedro
 Cáceres Museum
 Casa del Ajimez
 Casa-Museo Árabe Yusuf Al-Burch
 Casa Museo Guayasamín de Cáceres 
 Casa Museo Vasco Núñez de Balboa
 Ethnographic Museum "González Santana"
 Granite Museum
 Motorcycle Museum and Classic Car
 Museo de Arte Contemporáneo Helga de Alvear
 MUBA, Museo de Bellas Artes de Badajoz
 Museo del Automóvil
 Museo de la Cárcel Real
 Museo del Carnaval de Badajoz
 Museo Catedralicio Badajoz
 Museo de la Cereza
 Museo de las Ciencias del Vino
 Museo de la Ciudad de Badajoz "Luis de Morales
 Museo Etnográfico Textil Pérez Enciso de Plasencia
 Museo Extremeño e Iberoamericano de Arte Contemporáneo (Badajoz)
 Museo Fundación Pecharromán
 Museo Geológico y Minero de Santa Marta
 Museo de la Historia de la Medicina y la Salud de Extremadura
 Museo del Jamón de Monesterio
 Museo Papercraft Olivenza
 Museo Perez Comendador-Leroux
 Museo Taurino de Badajoz
 Museo Vostell Malpartida
 National Museum of Roman Art
 Palace los Golfines de Abajo
 Paprika Museum Jaraiz de la Vera
 Pizarro House Museum
 Santa Clara Museum

Galicia 
Archiepiscopal Towers Interpretation Centre
Barco-Museo Virgen del Carmen 
Casa de las Artes
Casa das Ciencias
Casa Histórica de Cambados
Casa do Patrón Museo Etnográfico
Cathedral Museum
Centro Arqueológico de la Villa Romana de Toralla
Centro Torrente Ballester CTB
Club Naval de Ferrol
College of Nosa Señora da Antiga
Contemporary Art Center of Galicia
Domus
Domus Mitreo
Fundación Barrié
Fundación Curros Enríquez
Fundación Eugenio Granell / Pazo del Marques de Bendaña
Illa das Esculturas
Museum of Contemporary Art, Vigo
Museu Nacional de Ciencia e Tecnología
Museo de Bellas Artes de Coruña
Museo Carlos Maside
Museo Casa de la Troya
Museo Estrella Galicia
Museo Etnográfico da Limia 
Museo Etnográfico Monte Caxado
Museo de Historia Natural da SGHN
Museo Interactivo da Historia de Lugo
Museo Man de Camelle
Museo do Mar de Galicia
Museo Municipal Manuel Torres
Museo Naval Ferrol
Museo de Prehistoria e Arqueoloxía de Vilalba
Museum of Pilgrimage
Museo Provincial de Lugo
Museo Provincial de Pontevedra - Edificio Castelao
Museo del Pueblo Gallego
Museo Quiñones de León
Océano Surf Museo
Palloza Museo Casa do Sesto
Pazo de San Isidro
Pazo de Tor
Pontevedra Museum
Pinacoteca Francisco Fernández del Riego
Saint Anton Castle
Sala de Exposicións Porta Miñá
Salinae - Centro Arqueolóxico do Areal
Spain's National Exhibition of Ship Building

La Rioja 

 Casa de las Ciencias
 Casa de la Imagen
 Centro de Interpretación Contrebia Leucade
 Cueva de los Cien Pilares
 Espacio Lagares
 History and Archeology Museum Najerillense
 Museo de Arte Contemporáneo de Haro El Torreón
 Museo de La Rioja
 Museo de la Romanización
 Museo Würth La Rioja
 Museo de la Verdura
 Paleontological Interpretation Center of La Rioja
 Sala Amós Salvador
 Winery - Vivanco Museum of Wine Culture

Community of Madrid 
Alcalá de Henares
 Regional Archaeological Museum of the Community of Madrid
Madrid

Region of Murcia 
 Archaeological Museum of Lorca
 Archaeological Museum of Murcia
 Arrabal de la Arrixaca
 Asociación Murciana de Amigos del Ferrocarril (AMAF)
 Centro de Visitantes Muralla de Murcia
 Centro de Visitantes de Monteagudo
 Conjunto Monumental San Juan de Dios
 La Casa del Belén
 National Museum of Subaquatic Archaeology (Cartagena)
 Museo Archicofradía De La Sangre
 Museum of the Cathedral of Murcia
 Museum of the City
 Museo de Bellas Artes de Murcia
 Museo de la Ciencia y el Agua
 Museo Hidráulico "Los Molinos del Río Segura"
 MUDEM (Museo del Enclave Muralla)
 Museo Ramón Gaya
 Museo Salzillo
 Museo de Santa Clara
 Real Casino de Murcia

Foral Community of Navarre 
 Amaiur Arkeologia Zentroa
 Casa Museo - Julián Gayarre - Museoetxea
 Jorge Oteiza Museum Foundation
 Las Eretas
 La Fábrica Vieja - Museo de la Conserva
 Molino de Zubieta - Zubietako Errota
 Museo Arqueológico de ANDELOS
 Museo del Carlismo
 Museo Casa Jenaro
 Museo Diocesano
 Museo de Estelas - Hilarriak
 Museo Etnografico del Reino de Pamplona
 Museo Etnológico de Navarra
 Museo -Gustavo de Maeztu- Museoa
 Museo Muñoz Sola de Arte Moderno
 Museo del Vino de Navarra
 Museum of Navarre, Pamplona
 Occidens Museum
 Parque-Museo Santxotena
 Tudela Museum
 Ultreia - Centro de Interpretación del Camino de Santiago
 University Museum of Navarra
 Witch Museum

Valencian Community 
 Alicante Museum of Contemporary Art
 Archaeological Museum of Alicante
 Archaeological Museum Camil Visedo
 Archaeological Museum of Gandia
 Associació Tren Alcoi Gandia 
 Bombas Gens
 Casa del Arte Mayor de la Seda
 Casa de la Cultura de Bellreguard
 Casa Museo Benlliure
 Centre Cultural Sala Parpallò
 Diocesan Cathedral Museum of Valencia
 Firefighters Museum of Alcoy
 Gravina Museum of Fine Arts
 González Martí National Museum of Ceramics and Decorative Arts
 Gremio Artesano de Artistas Falleros de Valencia
 Institut Valencià d'Art Modern
 La Almoina Archaeological Museum
 The Lladró Museum
 Museum of Fine Arts of Valencia
 Museo Alcoyano de la Fiesta (MAF)
 Museo Antonio Marco Belén Y Casitas De Muñecas
 Museo de Arte Contemporáneo de Villafamés
 Museo de Belenes
 Museo y Colegio del Arte Mayor de la Seda
 Museo Valenciano de la Ilustración y la Modernidad
 Museo de Bellas Artes de Castellón
 Museu de Belles Arts de València
 Museo del Calzado
 Museo Casa de las Rocas
 Museo Casa Estudio Enrique Lledó
 Museu de les Ciències Príncipe Felipe
 Museu Escolar de Puçol
 Museo Fallero de Gandía
 Museu Faller de València
 Museu de la Impremta i de les Arts Gràfiques
 Museo Histórico Militar
 Museo del Mar de Santa Pola
 Museo Nacional de Cerámica y Artes Suntuarias González Martí
 Museo Nino Bravo
 Museo del Pan
 Museo de Soldaditos de Plomo L’Iber
 Museo Taurino
 Museo del Turrón
 Museo The Ocean Race
 Natural Science Museum of Valencia
 Orange Museum
 Palau del Marqués de Campo
 Prehistory Museum of Valencia
 Real Academia de Bellas Artes de San Carlos de Valencia
 Segrelles Museum
 Valencia History Museum
 Valencian Museum of Ethnology

See also 
 List of libraries in Spain
 List of archives in Spain

References

External links 
 Directory of Museums and Collections of Spain
 2012 Statistics of Museums and Collections
 Museums of Andalusia (more)
 Best museums and art galleries in Spain

 
Museums